St. Francis Xavier Church, including ones named Cathedral, and variations may refer to:

Australia
 St Francis Xavier's Cathedral, Adelaide, South Australia
 St Francis Xavier's Cathedral, Geraldton, Western Australia
 St Francis Xavier Church, Goodna,

China
 Chapel of St. Francis Xavier, Macau
 St. Francis Xavier Church (Shanghai)

France
 Saint-François-Xavier, Paris

Germany
 St Francis Xavier Church, Dresden, Dresden, Saxony

India
 St. Francis Xavier Church, Mangalore, Karnataka
 St. Francis Xavier's Church, Pizhala, Kerala
 St. Francis Xavier's Church, Sampaloor, Kerala
 St. Xavier's Church, Peyad, Thiruvananthapuram, Kerala
 St. Francis Xavier's Church, Giriz, Vasai, Maharashtra
 St. Francis Xavier Church, Kethanahalli, Dharamapuri, Tamil Nadu
 St. Francis Xavier Church, Kovilur, Dharamapuri, Tamil Nadu

Ireland
 Saint Francis Xavier Church, Dublin

Lithuania 
 Church of St. Francis Xavier, Kaunas

Malaysia
 Church of St. Francis Xavier, Malacca City, Malacca
 St. Francis Xavier's Church, Petaling Jaya, Selangor
 St. Francis Xavier's Church, Georgetown, Penang

Netherlands
 St Francis Xavier Church, Enkhuizen

Oman 
 St. Francis Xavier Church, Salalah

Pakistan
St Francis Xavier Church, Sargodha

Singapore 
 Church of Saint Francis Xavier, Singapore

Slovakia
St. Francis Xavier Cathedral (Bystrica, Slovakia)

Thailand
St. Francis Xavier Church, Bangkok, Thailand

United Kingdom
 St Francis Xavier Church, Hereford, England
 St Francis Xavier Church, Liverpool, England
 St Joseph and St Francis Xavier Church, Richmond, England
 St. Francis Xavier Roman Catholic Church, Falkirk, Scotland
 St David Lewis and St Francis Xavier Church, Usk, in the North Gwent Deanery, Wales

United States
(by state then city)

Saint Francis Xavier Roman Catholic Church (Mobile, Alabama), listed on the National Register of Historic Places (NRHP)
Mission San Xavier del Bac, Tucson, Arizona, listed on the NRHP
Basilica of St. Francis Xavier, Dyersville, Dyersville, Iowa, listed on the NRHP
St. Francis Xavier Cathedral (Alexandria, Louisiana), listed on the NRHP
St. Francis Xavier Church (Baltimore, Maryland)
St. Francis Xavier Church and Newtown Manor House Historic District, Compton, Maryland, listed on the NRHP

St. Francis Xavier Church (Warwick, Maryland), listed on the NRHP in Maryland
Church of St. Francis Xavier (Benson, Minnesota), listed on the NRHP in Swift County, Minnesota

 Church of St. Francis Xavier (Grand Marais, Minnesota)
Church of St. Francis Xavier-Catholic (Grand Marais, Minnesota), Grand Marais, MN, listed on the NRHP in Minnesota
St. Francis Xavier Convent, Vicksburg, Mississippi, listed on the NRHP in Warren County
 St. Francis Xavier College Church, St. Louis, Missouri
 St. Francis Xavier Catholic Church and Rectory, Taos, Missouri
St. Francis Xavier Church (Missoula, Montana), listed on the NRHP in Montana
St. Francis Xavier Church (Manhattan), New York
St. Francis Xavier Church (Brooklyn), located in Park Slope, Brooklyn, New York
St. Francis Xavier's Church (Bronx, New York)
St. Francis Xavier Roman Catholic Parish Complex in Buffalo, New York
St. Francis Xavier Church (Cincinnati, Ohio), listed on the NRHP in Ohio
St. Francis Xavier Roman Catholic Church (Cresson, Pennsylvania)
St. Francis Xavier Church (Winooski, Vermont), listed on the Vermont State Historic Register
St. Francis Xavier Church (Parkersburg, West Virginia), listed on the NRHP in West Virginia
 Cathedral of Saint Francis Xavier in Green Bay, Green Bay, Wisconsin

See also
Church of St. Francis Xavier-Catholic (disambiguation)
 St. Francis Xavier Cathedral (disambiguation)
St. Francis Xavier (disambiguation)